Leonard Part 6 (also known as Leonard Part VI) is a 1987 American spy parody film. It was directed by Paul Weiland and starred Bill Cosby, who also produced the film and wrote its story. The film also starred Gloria Foster as the villain, and Joe Don Baker. The film was shot in the San Francisco Bay Area. It earned several Golden Raspberry Awards;  Cosby himself denounced and disowned it in the press in the weeks leading up to its release. 

The film was universally panned by critics and has often been considered to be one of the worst films ever made. It was also a box-office bomb, earning just over $4.6 million on a $24 million budget.

Plot
Bill Cosby plays Leonard Parker, a retired CIA spy who now operates a restaurant. According to the opening sequence of the film, the title refers to the idea that this film is actually the sixth installment of a series of films featuring the adventures of Leonard with parts one through five concealed in the interest of world security. In reality, no Leonard films precede this one.

The theatrical release poster points out that Leonard Parker is, at the time of his reluctant return to action, coping with domestic issues:

The film starts with Parker being called out of retirement by his CIA director Snyderburn (Baker) to save the world from evil vegetarian Medusa Johnson (Foster), who brainwashes animals to kill people. During the film, he infiltrates the International Tuna factory (Medusa Johnson's hideout), fights vegetarians dressed in bird costumes and "horny" bees, and successfully steals her mind control device. However, Medusa kidnaps Leonard's wife and blackmails the CIA into returning the device to her. Leonard then enlists laboratory rabbits to attack other CIA agents in an effort to regain the mind control device. Leonard again infiltrates Johnson's headquarters to rescue his wife, is captured and tortured by lobsters, but uses their claws to remove his restraints. Freed from his cell, he attacks Medusa's henchmen with "magic meat" he acquired from a Gypsy, frees the captive animals, and destroys the base using Alka-Seltzer. He escapes by riding an ostrich across the roof and, despite ostriches being flightless birds, he is flown to the ground by the animal.

Cast
 Bill Cosby as Leonard Parker
 Tom Courtenay as Frayn
 Joe Don Baker as Nick Snyderburn
 Moses Gunn as Giorgio Francozzi
 Gloria Foster as Medusa Johnson
 Pat Colbert as Allison Parker
 Victoria Rowell as Joan Parker
 John Hostetter as Adams

Production
Cosby says he got the idea for the film from watching Rambo. He said he thought to himself "Man, there's got to be a place for a hero who has to deal with a heavy who's got a bigger gun than he has." Cosby described the lead as a "high-tech comic-book character." He said, "I've put stuff in here for the women, I've put stuff in here for the kids."

Asked years later about his work on the film, director Paul Weiland recalled:

Reception
The movie received overwhelming negative reviews. When the film was released in 1987, even Cosby himself said that he was so disappointed with it that he publicly advised people not to waste their money on it.

Roger Ebert called it "one of the worst movies of the year" and strongly criticized the obvious Coca-Cola product placement in one of the film’s close-up scenes, saying that Cosby "ought to be ashamed of himself." Gene Siskel gave the film zero stars out of four, calling it "The year's worst film involving a major star. That's right, it's worse than Ishtar." Variety declared, "Bill Cosby is right to be embarrassed by this dud, but result really can't have come as a total surprise to him since he wrote the story and produced it." Caryn James of The New York Times wrote: "Mr. Cosby and the director, Paul Weiland, were reportedly at odds while filming Leonard Part 6...but there's plenty of blame for them to share. Mr. Weiland's direction, Mr. Cosby's story and Jonathan Reynolds's screenplay seem equally trite." Kevin Thomas of the Los Angeles Times wrote: "Leonard Part 6 is a smug, tedious exercise in self-indulgence ... There's virtually nothing to laugh at in this film, and too much of everything else." Thomas noted that, although Weiland was the director, "clearly Cosby, as star, producer and idea man, is the auteur here." Rita Kempley of The Washington Post stated: "Cosby looks woebegone all movie long. He knows he's out of his element, a comedian of words in a physical role." Robert Garrett wrote in The Boston Globe, "This Christmas turkey is so dreadful that it must be in the same league as Paul Newman's The Silver Chalice for its power to embarrass its star."

As of June 2022, Leonard Part 6 had a 7% rating on Rotten Tomatoes based on 14 reviews.

Box office
The movie was a box office flop. It only grossed $4,615,255—a mere fraction of its $24 million budget.

Accolades
The movie won three Golden Raspberry Awards, for Worst Actor (Cosby), Worst Picture, and Worst Screenplay (Jonathan Reynolds and Cosby). It was nominated for two more Razzie Awards, for Worst Supporting Actress (Foster) and Worst Director (Weiland). A few weeks after the ceremony, Cosby accepted his three Razzies on Fox's The Late Show. He demanded that the three Razzies he earned be specifically made out of 24 karat (99.99%) gold and Italian marble, which were later paid for by Fox. Cosby later brought the awards with him when he was a guest on The Tonight Show Starring Johnny Carson, happily displaying them and proclaiming, "I swept the awards!" For the 2005 Razzies, the movie earned a nomination in the "Worst 'Comedy' of Our First 25 Years" category, losing to Gigli.

It was also nominated for Worst Picture at the 1987 Stinkers Bad Movie Awards.

Home media
Leonard Part 6 was released by Sony Pictures Home Entertainment  on DVD, on April 26, 2005.

See also
 List of films considered the worst

References

External links

 
 
 
 

1987 films
American parody films
American spy comedy films
Columbia Pictures films
1980s English-language films
Films scored by Elmer Bernstein
Films about the Central Intelligence Agency
Films directed by Paul Weiland
1980s spy comedy films
African-American comedy films
Films shot in San Francisco
1980s parody films
1987 directorial debut films
1987 comedy films
Golden Raspberry Award winning films
1980s American films